The Lady from Hell is a 1926 American silent Western film directed by Stuart Paton and starring Roy Stewart, Blanche Sweet, and Ralph Lewis.

It was released in the United Kingdom later the same year by Ideal Films under the alternative title of Interrupted Wedding.

Plot
As described in a film magazine review, following his service in World War I, Sir Robin Carmichael, a former British army officer from Scotland who works as a foreman of a ranch in America under an assumed name, gives a woman a gun to protect herself against her brutal husband. The woman’s little son Billy kills his father to save her from being beaten. In the meantime, Sir Robin has returned to his home in Scotland and is about to be wed to Lady Margaret Darnely. He is extradited back to the American town near the ranch on his wedding day on a charge of murder, but is cleared by the confession of the boy and his mother.

Cast

References

External links

1926 films
1926 Western (genre) films
American black-and-white films
Films directed by Stuart Paton
Associated Exhibitors films
Films set in Scotland
Silent American Western (genre) films
1920s English-language films
1920s American films